Kafr Qasem Sign Language is a village sign language of Israel.

References

Village sign languages
Sign languages of Israel